Capsized! is the ninth studio album released by the Ohio rock band Circus Devils in October, 2011.  All songs on Capsized! were written and performed by Robert Pollard, Todd Tobias, and Tim Tobias.

Capsized! is a song cycle with a nautical theme, centered on an unnamed character and his friend Wallace who experience life aboard a haunted ship.  The moods range from sunny optimism to melancholia, claustrophobia and terror.  Eclectic song styles include pop, mellow rock, aggressive rock and soundcapes.

Track listing 
 "To England the Tigers"
 "Capsized!"
 "Cyclopean Runways"
 "Legendary Breakfast Code"
 "Nully Scully"
 "Aerial Poop Show"
 "Hangerman Suits"
 "Leave the Knife Curtis"
 "Vampire Playing a Red Piano"
 "Double Vission"
 "What Wallace?"
 "Plate of Scales"
 "Siren"
 "Henry Loop"
 "Stiffs on Parade"
 "The Matter of Being Good"
 "Gable's Ear Wax"
 "End of the Swell"
 "Safe on a Vegetable"

External links 
 the Official Circus Devils site
 Capsized! at allmusic.com

Circus Devils albums
2011 albums